Requiem is the fourth studio album by John 5, released on July 3, 2008. It is essentially an instrumental metal album, but it also has some bluegrass elements. The album is notable for having the majority of its songs named after medieval torture devices.

The first single, "Sounds of Impalement", was released via John 5's official website.

Reception
The album received generally positive reviews, the album received a 3/5 on Sputnik Music and a 10/10 on FPM102, the highest rating the site had ever given to a metal album.

Track listing

Personnel
John 5 – lead guitar, banjo, bass.  Also co-producer album
Tommy Clufetos – drums
Chris Baseford – producer

John 5 (guitarist) albums
2008 albums
Instrumental albums